I'm So in Love: Grandes Éxitos is the second greatest hits album by Mexican pop singer Paulina Rubio. It was released in 2002. Like her previous compilation Top Hits, released only a year before (2001), I'm So in Love: Grandes Éxitos contains Rubio's biggest Spanish hits from 1992 up to 1996, with the addition of the English versions of her hits "Enamorada" (as the title track "I'm So In Love") and Sólo Por Ti (as "Only For You"). The album also contains a remix of "I'm So In Love" and a medley of her hits previously included in Top Hits.

The song "I'm So In Love" was released to US Rhythmic radio only in January 2002.

Background
In 1996, Rubio released her last album under the EMI Latin label, the Spanish-language Planeta Paulina. Rubio also recorded English versions of several of the songs on the album, but eventually they were not included. The English songs were being held to be released as part of Paulina's first English crossover album, which was supposed to be the English version of the Planeta Paulina album, but EMI later declined to release it. Some of these English songs were finally released years later as part of an album on this hits compilation.

Track listing

Charts

Notes

References

2001 greatest hits albums
Paulina Rubio compilation albums
EMI Records compilation albums
Spanish-language compilation albums